Kong Hongxing (born February 12, 1992) is a Chinese Sanda kickboxer training out of the Shaolin Tagou Martial Arts School. Aside from being one of China's most decorated Sanda athletes, he is also notable for having an upset victory over the Muay Thai legend Saenchai.

Background

Kong Hongxing was born on May 25, 1992 in Lankao County, Henan to a rural family of farmers with his father being a martial artist himself. As a child, Kong had a keen interest and passion for martial arts as he would often practice with his father. However, because of his energetic nature, he was noted to have no interest in his school work and would often having trouble staying on task. This eventually led to his father enrolling him into the Tagou Martial Arts school where he would begin to lay the foundations of a successful sanda career.

Career 
December 28, 2013, Foshan K-1 World MAX 2013 World Championship, Kong Hongxing fought the Muay Thai Legend Saenchai under K-1 Rules. The fight was declared a draw after three rounds of back and forth action from both fighters causing the judges to declare an extra round to determine a victor. Kong was ultimately declared the winner via split decision after a very close and evenly matched fourth round.

October 14, 2017, Guangzhou Glory 46: China, Kong Hongxing made his GLORY debut in a sanda bout against fellow countryman Yang Sun. Being the far more experienced and decorated competitor, Kong only needed 36 seconds to Knockout his opponent with a devastating head kick in the first round.

Championships and awards 

Sanda
World Sanda Championships
2015 World Sanda Championships -60 kg
National Wushu Championships
2015 National Wushu Championships Men's Sanda -60 kg
2014 National Wushu Championships Men's Sanda -60 kg
Asian Games
2014 Asian Games Men's Sanda  −60 kg 
Sanda Premiere League
2018 SPL Tournament Winner −65 kg

Kickboxing and Sanda record (incomplete)

|- style="background:#cfc;"
| 2018-12-30 || Win ||align=left| Chen Hongxing || Sanda Premiere League year-end finals: 65 kg|| Shanghai, China || TKO (Throw)|| 1 ||2:58
|-
! style=background:white colspan=9 |
|- style="background:#cfc;"
| 2018-09-22 || Win ||align=left| Takaki Hosogoe || Kunlun Fight || Wenzhou City, China || KO (Left Hook)|| 1 ||1:42
|- style="background:#cfc;"
| 2018-05-12 || Win ||align=left| Wang Tengteng || Sanda Premiere League || Shanghai, China || Decision (Unanimous) || 3 ||3:00
|- style="background:#cfc;"
| 2017-10-14 || Win ||align=left| Yang Sun || Glory 46: China || Guangzhou, China || KO (Left Head Kick)|| 1 ||0:36
|- style="background:#cfc;"
| 2015-11-18 || Win ||align=left| Ali Magomedov || 2015 Jakarta Men's sanda 60 kg Finals || Jakarta, Indonesia ||Decision (2–0) || 3 ||3:00
|-
! style=background:white colspan=9 |
|- style="background:#cfc;"
| 2014-09-24 || Win ||align=left| Jean Claude Saclag || 2014 Asian Games Men's sanda 60 kg Finals || Incheon, South Korea ||Decision (2–0)|| 3 ||3:00
|-
! style=background:white colspan=9 |
|- style="background:#cfc;"
| 2014-09-23 || Win ||align=left| Kang Yeong-sik || 2014  Asian Games Men's sanda 60 kg Semi Finals || Incheon, South Korea ||Decision (2–0)|| 3 ||3:00
|- style="background:#cfc;"
| 2014-09-22 || Win ||align=left| Li Sone Wai || 2014 Asian Games Men's sanda 60 kg Quarter Finals || Incheon, South Korea ||Decision (2–0)|| 3 ||3:00
|- style="background:#cfc;"
| 2014-09-21 || Win ||align=left| Rustam Ibragimov || 2014 Asian Games Men's sanda 60 kg First Round || Incheon, South Korea ||Decision (2–0)|| 3 ||3:00
|- style="background:#cfc;"
| 2013-12-28 || Win ||align=left| Saenchai || K-1 World MAX 2013 World Championship || Foshan, China ||Ext. R Decision (Split)|| 4 ||3:00
|-
|-
| colspan=9 | Legend:

External links
Kong Hongxing −2014 Asian Games Athlete Profile

References 

Chinese male kickboxers
Bantamweight kickboxers
1992 births
Living people
Chinese sanshou practitioners
Sportspeople from Henan
Chinese wushu practitioners
People from Kaifeng
Wushu practitioners at the 2014 Asian Games
Medalists at the 2014 Asian Games
Asian Games gold medalists for China
Asian Games medalists in wushu